Fimbriidae is a family of saltwater clams. marine bivalve molluscs in the superfamily Lucinoidea. Some modern studies indicate that Fimbriidae should be included in the family Lucinidae. The family contains only one Recent genus, Fimbria, with two known species.

Genera and species
Genera and species within the family Fimbriidae include:
Fimbria Megerle von Mühlfeld, 1811 
Fimbria fimbriata (Linnaeus, 1758)
Fimbria soverbii (Reeve, 1842)
Hamamlia †
Cerkesia †

References

 
Bivalve families
Obsolete animal taxa